The 2022 Alabama Crimson Tide football team (variously "Alabama", "Bama", or "The Tide") represented the University of Alabama in the 2022 NCAA Division I FBS football season. This season marked the Crimson Tide's 128th overall season, 90th as a member of the Southeastern Conference (SEC), and 31st within the SEC Western Division. They played their home games at Bryant–Denny Stadium in Tuscaloosa, Alabama, and were led by 16th-year head coach Nick Saban.

Previous season

The Crimson Tide finish the 2021 season with a record of 13–2 (7–1 in the SEC) as the defending consensus national champions and SEC champions, beating an undefeated Cincinnati in the College Football Playoff Semifinal before losing to Georgia in the 2022 College Football National Championship (rematch from the from 2021 SEC Championship Game and 2018 College Football Playoff National Championship).

Offseason

Departures

Team departures
Over the course of the off-season, Alabama lost 37 total players. 8 players graduated, 6 declared for the 2022 NFL Draft, while the other 23 entered the transfer portal.

Outgoing transfers
Twenty-three players elected to enter the NCAA Transfer Portal during or after the 2021 season.

Note: Players with a dash in the new school column didn't land on a new team for the 2022 season.

Acquisitions

Incoming transfers

Over the off-season, Alabama added 6 players from the transfer portal. According to 247 Sports, Alabama had the 6th ranked transfer class in the country. The first transfer was running back Jahmyr Gibbs. Gibbs transferred from Georgia Tech. On the offensive side, Alabama also added Georgia wide receiver Jermaine Burton, Louisville wide receiver Tyler Harrell and Vanderbilt offensive lineman Tyler Steen. However, Alabama only took 1 defensive transfer in LSU defensive back Elias Ricks.

2022 recruiting class

Alabama signed 26 players in the class of 2022. The Crimson Tide' recruiting class ranks 2nd in the 247Sports and Rivals rankings. Nineteen signees were ranked in the ESPN 300 top prospect list. Alabama also signed walk-ons during national signing period.

  

  
  
  
   
   
  
 

    
 

 

  
  
  
 

*= 247Sports Composite rating; ratings are out of 1.00. (five stars= 1.00–.98, four stars= .97–.90, three stars= .80–.89, two stars= .79–.70, no stars= <70)
†= Despite being rated as a four and five star recruit by ESPN, On3.com, Rivals.com and 247Sports.com, Alexander received a five star 247Sports Composite rating.
Δ= Left the Alabama program following signing but prior to the 2022 season.

2022 overall class rankings

Walk-ons

2023 recruiting class
 

 
 
 
 
 
 
 

 
 
  
  
  

 

  
 
 

2023 Overall class rankings

NFL draft
 
Several Crimson Tide players have declared for the 2022 NFL Draft thus far. Wide receivers Slade Bolden, John Metchie III and Jameson Williams, running back Brian Robinson, offensive lineman Evan Neal, defensive lineman Phidarian Mathis, defensive backs Josh Jobe and Jalyn Armour-Davis and linebackers Chris Allen and Christian Harris. They all entered their names into the draft pool. Due to COVID-19, the NCAA granted an extra year of eligibility to all college athletes, and all could have returned for another year at Alabama.

Returning starters

Offense

Defense

Special teams

 
† Indicates player was a starter in 2021 but missed all of 2022 due to injury.

Preseason

Spring game

The Crimson Tide are scheduled to hold spring practices in March and April 2022 with the Alabama football spring game, "A-Day" to take place in Tuscaloosa, AL on April 16, 2022.

Award watch lists
Listed in the order that they were released

SEC media days
The 2022 SEC Media days were held on July 18–21, 2022 at College Football Hall of Fame and The Omni Atlanta Hotel at CNN Center in Atlanta, GA with Nick Saban (HC), Bryce Young (QB), Jordan Battle (DL) and Will Anderson Jr. (LB). The Preseason Polls were released July 22, 2022. Each team had their head coach available to talk to the media at the event. Coverage of the event was televised on SEC Network and ESPN.

Preseason All-SEC

Media
First Team

Second Team

Third Team

Source:

Coaches

First Team

Second Team

Third Team

Source:

Preseason All-Americans

Personnel

Roster

Coaching staff

 
Support staff
 JT summerford – Director of Football Operations
 Brandy lyerly – Associate Director of Football Operations
 Ashleigh kimble – Associate Director of Recruiting Operations
 Ellis ponder – Associate Athletic Director & Football Chief Operating Officer
 Sam petitto – Director of Personnel Operations 
 Bob welton – Director of Player Personnel 
 Roger bedford – Assistant Director of Player Personnel
 Joe Pendry – Special Assistant to Head Coach 
 Todd watson – Special Assistant to Head Coach 
 Sal Sunseri – Senior Special Assistant to Head Coach 
 Drew svoboda – Senior Special Assistant to Head Coach 
 Erinn joe – Assistant Director of Player Personnel
 Denzel devall – Player Personnel/Player Development Assistant
 Josh chapman – Director of Player Development
 Evan van nostrand – Assistant Director of Player Development, Character and Career Development
 Daniel bush – Director of Football Recruitment
 Makenzie votteler – Associate Director, Football Recruitment
 Carrigan johnson – Football Operations Coordinator 
 Cedric burns – Athletics Relations Coordinator 
 Savannah french – Football Marketing Coordinator
 Kyle smith – Director of Football Equipment 
 Jeff springer – Assistant Athletic Director of Equipment Operations 
 Tim roberts – Intern Equipment Manager
 Linda leoni – Administrative Assistant
 Glenda edwards – Administrative Secretary
 Daniel lyerly – Assistant Athletic Director of Football Video Operations 
 Kaleb medema – Assistant Director of Football Video Operations
 Cass mccord – Assistant Director of Football Video Operations
 Jessica beckenstein – head coach's Office Coordinator 
 Paul constantine – Director of Sports Applied Science 
 Rick danison – Assistant Strength and Conditioning Coach
 UJ johnson – Assistant Strength and Conditioning Coach 
 Jessica pare – Deputy Athletic Director, External
 Josh maxson – Assistant Athletic Director of communications

Assistants
Max Bullough 
 Brenten Wimberly
 Ryan Finck
 Braxton Barker
Analysts
Dean Altobelli
Bert Biffani 
 Alex Mortensen 
 Will Lawing
 Dave Huxtable
Nick Cochran
George Banko 
 Zach Mettenberger
 Derek Dooley
 Todd Grantham
 Cornelius Williams
 Nick McGriff

Depth chart

True Freshman

Schedule
The 2022 Crimson Tide' schedule consists of 7 home games and 5 away games for the regular season. Alabama will host four SEC conference opponents Mississippi State (rivalry), Vanderbilt, Texas A&M and arch-rival Auburn for the 87th Iron Bowl to close out the SEC regular season at home and will travel to four SEC opponents, Arkansas, Ole Miss (rivalry), Tennessee (Third Saturday in October) and rival LSU (rivalry) to close out the SEC regular season on the road. Alabama is not scheduled to play SEC East opponents Florida (rivalry), Georgia (rivalry), Kentucky, Missouri, and South Carolina in the 2022 regular season. The Crimson Tide's bye week comes during week 9 (on October 29, 2022).

Alabama's out of conference opponents represent the Mountain West, Big 12, Sun Belt and ASUN conferences. The Crimson Tide will host three non–conference games which are against Utah State from the Mountain West, Louisiana–Monroe from the Sun Belt and to close out the regular season with Austin Peay from the ASUN (FCS) and will travel against Texas (Big 12) in Austin, TX.

Game summaries

Utah State

Sources:

at Texas

Sources:

Louisiana–Monroe

Sources:

Vanderbilt

Sources:

at No. 20 Arkansas

Sources:

Texas A&M

Sources:

|-

at No. 6 Tennessee

Sources:

No. 24 Mississippi State

Sources:

at No. 10 LSU

Sources:

 

 

|-

at No. 11 Ole Miss

Sources:

Austin Peay

Sources:

Auburn

Sources:

vs. No. 9 Kansas State

Sources:

Rankings

Statistics

Team

Individual leaders

Defense

Key: POS: Position, SOLO: Solo Tackles, AST: Assisted Tackles, TOT: Total Tackles, TFL: Tackles-for-loss, SACK: Quarterback Sacks, INT: Interceptions, BU: Passes Broken Up, PD: Passes Defended, QBH: Quarterback Hits, FR: Fumbles Recovered, FF: Forced Fumbles, BLK: Kicks or Punts Blocked, SAF: Safeties, TD : Touchdown

Special teams

Scoring
Alabama vs Non-Conference Opponents

Alabama vs SEC Opponents

Alabama vs All Opponents

After the season

Awards and SEC honors

All-Americans

All Star game

NFL draft

The NFL Draft will be held at Arrowhead Stadium in Kansas City, MO on April 27–29, 2023.
 
Crimson Tide who were picked in the 2023 NFL Draft:

NFL Draft combine
No members of the 2022 team were invited to participate in drills at the 2023 NFL scouting Combine.
 

† Top performer
 
DNP = Did not participate

Media affiliates

Radio
 WTID (FM) (Tide 102.9) – Nationwide (Dish Network, Sirius XM, TuneIn radio and iHeartRadio)

TV
CBS Family – CBS 42 (CBS), CBS Sports Network 
ESPN/ABC Family – ABC 33/40 (ABC), ABC, ESPN, ESPN2, ESPNU, ESPN+, SEC Network
FOX Family – WBRC (FOX), FOX/FS1, FSN
NBC – WVTM-TV, NBC Sports, NBCSN

TV ratings

All totals via Sports Media Watch. Streaming numbers not included. † - Data not available.

References

Alabama
Alabama Crimson Tide football seasons
Sugar Bowl champion seasons
Alabama Crimson Tide football